Efthalia "Thaleia" Koutroumanidou (born 7 October 1982 in Volos) is a Greek Olympic beach volleyballer at the 2008 Summer Olympics and the 2004 Athens Olympics. She is partnered with Maria Tsiartsiani.

References

1982 births
Living people
Greek beach volleyball players
Beach volleyball players at the 2004 Summer Olympics
Beach volleyball players at the 2008 Summer Olympics
Olympic beach volleyball players of Greece
Sportspeople from Volos
Greek sportswomen